Gay Times (stylized in all caps), also known as GAY TIMES Magazine and as GT, is a UK-based LGBTQ+ media brand established in 1984. Originally a magazine for gay and bisexual men, the company now includes content for the LGBTQ+ community across a number of outlets, including a monthly digital magazine, a website updated daily with news and culture content, and a number of social-media platforms.

Publication and content
GAY TIMES Magazine is published digitally each month in the United Kingdom and distributed globally, and includes interviews, fashion, news, features, music, film, style and travel. GAY TIMES also features an online site as well as social promotion channels under the brand name.

The magazine is published by GAY TIMES Ltd. The current CEO of GAY TIMES Ltd. is Tag Warner, who was appointed in January 2019. The magazine ceased print publication in September 2021 and now releases a digital issue each month via the GAY TIMES app, Apple News+, Readly and other popular digital publication providers. The current editorial director of GAY TIMES is Lewis Corner.

Amplify by GAY TIMES is a monthly digital cover story which focuses on emerging talent and community conversations. It was created in January 2019.

In September 2021, GAY TIMES became the first LGBTQ+ publication to pass a million followers on Instagram.

ELEVATE by GAY TIMES and Apple Music is a collaboration between the companies with the aim to support and platform emerging LGBTQ+ music talent. Previous ELEVATE artists include Arlo Parks, Rina Sawayama, Victoria Monét and Hope Tala.

The organisation hosts GAY TIMES Honours, an annual awards show celebrating figures in and beyond the LGBTQ+ community for their contributions. Previous winners include the cast of Heartstopper, Sir Ian McKellen, Pabllo Vittar, Honey Dijon, Kylie Minogue, Tom Daley and akt. This began in 2017.

Amplifund is a philanthropic initiative founded by GAY TIMES in partnership with GiveOut. It launched in June 2019 and raises money for global LGBTQ+ communities in countries where LGBTQ+ people face daily challenges. It has supported LGBTQ+ people in Jamaica, Iraq, and Armenia, among other territories.

See also

List of LGBT periodicals
List of men's magazines

References

External links
 

1975 establishments in the United Kingdom
Gay men's magazines published in the United Kingdom
Magazines established in 1975
Magazines published in London
Monthly magazines published in the United Kingdom
Online magazines published in the United Kingdom